Photuris pensylvanica, known by the common names Pennsylvania firefly, lightning bug, dot-dash firefly and (in its larval state) glowworm, is a species of firefly from the United States and Canada. It is also widely known under the Latin name Photuris pennsylvanica, although the original spelling, with one "n", was common in Latinized names of the time and remains the valid name.

Description
Its primary color is black, but it has two bright red eyespots on its thorax, as well as yellow edging on its thorax and wing cases and usually a lengthwise yellow stripe partway down the center of each of the latter. The species is carnivorous, feeding mostly on insects but also on other invertebrates, such as land snails and earthworms. The terminal segments of its abdomen are white-yellow and glow greenish-yellow when the insect manifests its bioluminescence. The females of this species, like those of other members of the genus, lure males of other species by imitating their flash patterns in order to prey on them.

State insect
In 1974, P. pensylvanica was designated the state insect of Pennsylvania. Its designation as such started with a group of Highland Park Elementary School students in Upper Darby, Pennsylvania. Fireflies are abundant in Pennsylvania and are enjoyed for their ability to "transform a midsummer night into a fairyland of tiny, brilliant twinkling lights" Discovering that there was a species of firefly named after their state and that no other U.S. state had adopted a firefly as its state insect, the students began their campaign to have P. pensylvanica made Pennsylvania's state insect.

With advice and support from state legislators, the students began a campaign that included letter writing, the circulation of petitions, and the distribution of bumper stickers. On April 10, 1974, Governor Milton J. Shapp signed Act 59 into law, making the Pennsylvania firefly their state's official insect. A few years later, Highland Park Elementary School was presented with a bronze plaque in honor of the students' achievement.

Many Pennsylvanians know these insects by the name "lightning bugs" and may have confused "firefly" with "black fly" when that state was plagued by them in 1988. This might be why that year the legislature again confirmed the Pennsylvania firefly's official status and specified it by scientific name. The amended act reads:

Section 1. The firefly (Lampyridae Coleoptera) of the species Photuris pensylvanica De Geer is hereby selected, designated and adopted as the official insect of the Commonwealth of Pennsylvania.
(1 amended Dec. 5, 1988, P.L.1101, No.130)

The firefly is also the state insect of Tennessee, but in this case the specific species referred to (if any) may be Photinus pyralis, the most common species of firefly in North America.

See also
List of U.S. state insects

References

Beetles described in 1774
Taxa named by Charles De Geer
Fauna of the Northeastern United States
Photuris